The 2015 ITF Women's Circuit – Wuhan was a professional tennis tournament played on outdoor hard courts. It was the second edition of the tournament and part of the 2015 ITF Women's Circuit, offering a total of $50,000 in prize money. It took place in Wuhan, China, on 18–24 May 2015.

Singles main draw entrants

Seeds 

 1 Rankings as of 11 May 2015

Other entrants 
The following players received wildcards into the singles main draw:
  Gai Ao
  Liu Siqi
  Lu Jingjing

The following players received entry from the qualifying draw:
  Kang Jiaqi
  Kim Na-ri
  You Xiaodi
  Zhao Di

Champions

Singles

 Zhang Yuxuan def.  Liu Chang, 6–4, 6–0

Doubles

 Chang Kai-chen /  Han Xinyun def.  Liu Chang /  Lu Jiajing, 6–0, 6–3

External links 
 2015 ITF Women's Circuit – Wuhan at ITFtennis.com

2015 ITF Women's Circuit
2015
2015 in Chinese tennis